The Indian War Memorial Museum is located in the Naubat Khana of the Red Fort in Delhi, northern India.  It is built in 1919 as  a tribute to commemorate the soldiers who had joined the First World War in India or abroad on behalf of the British Empire.

Exhibition 

The museum is located on the first and second floor of the drum house. It contains several galleries pertaining to the military history of India during the first and second world war.

Items that are on display is a diorama of the Battle of Panipat (1526), in which Babur defeated the forces of Ibrahim Lodi and established the Mughal Empire. 

Further objects on display are traditional weapons such as daggers and gupti, as well as arms and helmets. The advent of the industrialisation brought in new weapons such as machine guns and grenades. 

Various badges, ribbons, and uniforms of Turkish and New Zealand army officers, and flags are also on display. 

The dress of Maharaja Pratap Singh of Idar, a renowned soldier and military man, is displayed, which includes the kurta (long shirt), belt, trouser, turban with zari work, shoes and inscribed sword with sheath.

References

External links 

 amateur video of the Indian War Memorial Museum

Museums in Delhi
Red Fort
Military and war museums in India
1919 establishments in India
Museums established in 1919